Psychotherapy and Psychosomatics is a bimonthly peer-reviewed medical journal covering psychotherapy and psychosomatic medicine. It was established in 1953 under the name Acta Psychotherapeutica et Psychosomatica, obtaining its current name in 1965. It is published by Karger Publishers and the editor-in-chief is Giovanni Fava (University of Bologna). According to the Journal Citation Reports, the journal has a 2018 impact factor of 13.744.

References

External links

Psychosomatic medicine journals
Psychotherapy journals
Karger academic journals
Publications established in 1953
Bimonthly journals
Multilingual journals